Ruth Patricia Shellhorn (1909-2006) was a Los Angeles-based landscape architect of the post-war era.  She is known for the development of the "Southern California Look". With a focus on indoor/outdoor living, she incorporated topography and nature into urban settings to create sustainable landscapes in her designs for residences, retail, city and regional parks, universities, and colleges. 
She was the Los Angeles Times 1955's woman of the year.

Her work on the Shoreline Development Study became a precedent for development along the California Coast.
She designed Bullock's department store, the Fashion Square shopping centers at Santa Ana, Sherman Oaks, La Habra and Del Amo in Torrance. In 1956, she was hired by Walt Disney to create a comprehensive pedestrian circulation system for  Disneyland, establishing central landscaping elements of the park.

Early life and education 

Shellhorn was born on September 21, 1909, and grew up in Pasadena. Her father was a dentist and her mother volunteered at numerous civic and city beautifying organization. Her parents encouraged her to pursue a profession that used both her mathematical skills and her artistic mind. Her neighbor, landscape architect Florence Yoch inspired her and recommended that she become a landscape architect.

After high school, Shellhorn attended the School of Landscape Architecture at Oregon Agricultural State College from 1927 to 1930. While she was there, she was the first woman to win the Alpha Zeta Scholarship Cup. She also won an award in a national Beaux-Arts design competition.

In 1930, she transferred to Cornell University, where she took engineering and architecture classes. She was the only woman in her class of six in the Department of Landscape Architecture. She originally did not receive her degree, she was considered 4 units short. However, in 2005, Shellhorn’s records were reviewed by Cornell and, she was awarded degrees in Architecture and Landscape Architecture.

When she returned to Southern California in 1933, she was one of the rare designers to be professionally trained, which distinguished her from most male practitioners.

Works 

Shellhorn was also a major advocate for Land Studies. She spent two years working with the Shoreline Development Study for the Greater Los Angeles Citizen's Committee. She focused on bringing restrictions on oil drilling in Santa Monica Bay, a precedent for the goals of the later-enacted California Coastal Act, an advocate for the use of public funding for recreation and parkland acquisition. The study also set precedent for Los Angeles's first sewage treatment plant.

References

Bibliography 
 Comras, Kelly. Ruth Shellhorn. 2016. Amherst, MA: Library of American Landscape History, and Athens, GA: The University of Georgia Press.

1909 births
2006 deaths
Women landscape architects
Landscape architects
California women architects
Cornell University alumni
20th-century American women
21st-century American women